The Chick Lang Stakes is a Grade III American Thoroughbred horse race for three-year-old horses run over a distance of six furlongs during the third week of May at Pimlico Race Course in Baltimore, Maryland.

History

The race is named in honor of the former Pimlico General Manager who was known to Marylanders as "Mr. Preakness." Charles John (Chick) Lang died March 18, 2010, of natural causes at the age of 83. The Maryland Jockey Club made the name change shortly after his death.

The race was formerly named in honor of U.S. Racing Hall of Fame trainer Hirsch Jacobs (1904–1970). Jacobs was a leading trainer, owner and breeder at many eastern tracks from the 1930s through the 1960s. One of horse racing's premier trainers, Jacobs saddled 3,569 winners in his lifetime, more than anyone else in the history of thoroughbred racing at the time of his retirement. Horses that he trained earned more than $12,000,000 in purses. Jacobs led the United States in total number of yearly winners 11 times from 1933 to 1944, except 1940, when he finished second.

The Hirsch Jacobs Stakes was inaugurated in 1975. It became an American graded stakes race in 2005. The fastest time for the race is held by Songster, who won in 2006 in a time of 1:09.72.

Records 

Speed record: 
 6 furlongs – 1:09.10 – Lantana Mob  (2008)

Most wins by a horse:
 No horse has won this race more than once.

Most wins by an owner:
 2 – Hal C.B. Clagett   (1991, 1994)
 2 – Israel Cohen  (1992, 1993)
 2 – Zayat Stables (2013, 2016)
 2 – William & Corinne Heiligbrodt (2020, 2021)

Most wins by a jockey:
 4 – Rick Wilson (1984, 1998, 1999, 2000)
 3 – Ramon Domínguez (2002, 2003, 2004)

Most wins by a trainer:
 4 – Steve Asmussen (2008, 2015, 2018, 2020)
 4 – Ben W. Perkins Jr.    (1995, 1999, 2000, 2011)

Winners of the Chick Lang Stakes since 1975

See also 
 Chick Lang Stakes "top three finishers" and starters

References 

1975 establishments in Maryland
Horse races in Maryland
Pimlico Race Course
Flat horse races for three-year-olds
Graded stakes races in the United States
Recurring sporting events established in 1975